Renée J. Miller  is University Distinguished Professor at Northeastern University, a former professor of Computer Science at University of Toronto, Canada, and a Fellow of the Royal Society of Canada.

Background 

She received BS degrees in Mathematics and in Cognitive Science from the Massachusetts Institute of Technology. She received her MS and PhD degrees in Computer Science from the University of Wisconsin in Madison, United States. She received the Presidential Early Career Award for Scientists and Engineers (PECASE), the highest honor bestowed by the United States government on outstanding scientists and engineers beginning their careers. She received the National Science Foundation Early Career Award (formerly, the Presidential Young Investigator Award) for her work on Data Integration. She was elected as a Fellow of the Association for Computing Machinery (ACM) in 2010, and a Fellow of the Royal Society of Canada in 2011. She is the President of the VLDB Endowment, and the Program Chair for ACM SIGMOD 2011 in Athens, Greece. Her research interests are in the efficient, effective use of large volumes of complex, heterogeneous data. This interest spans data integration, data exchange, knowledge curation and data sharing.

References

External links 
 Renée J. Miller home page
 

Year of birth missing (living people)
Living people
University of Wisconsin–Madison College of Letters and Science alumni
American computer scientists
Academic staff of the University of Toronto
Northeastern University faculty
Fellows of the Association for Computing Machinery
Database researchers
Massachusetts Institute of Technology School of Science alumni
American women computer scientists
Fellows of the Royal Society of Canada
Canadian women scientists
American women academics
21st-century American women